Josef Wahl (born 28 March 1943) is an Austrian footballer. He played in one match for the Austria national football team in 1966.

References

External links
 

1943 births
Living people
Austrian footballers
Austria international footballers
Place of birth missing (living people)
Association footballers not categorized by position